François De Vries , also named Sooi or Frans (born 21 August 1913 in Antwerp — died 17 February 1972) was a Belgian footballer.

Biography 

He played for Royal Antwerp FC as a striker. He played with the Belgium team at the World Cup in 1934 where he made his international debut.

Honours 
 Belgian international from 1934 to 1938 (7 caps and one goal)
 Participation in the 1934 World Cup (1 match played)
 Belgian Champions in 1931 with Royal Antwerp FC

References

External links
 

1913 births
1972 deaths
Footballers from Antwerp
Belgian footballers
Belgium international footballers
1934 FIFA World Cup players
Royal Antwerp F.C. players
Belgian Pro League players
Léopold FC players

Association football forwards